The 1939 Australian Track Cycling Championships were held on the board track at the Sydney Sports Arena from 25 February to 1 March 1939. This was the first time the Australian Championships were held at this track. The (amateur) championships coincided with a 'test match' between Australian and World cycling teams. The 1939 championships also doubled as trials for the 1940 Summer Olympics (which were later cancelled due to World War II).

Healing Shield Winners: New South Wales

References

External links 

1940 Summer Olympics
Australian Track Cycling Championships
1939 in Australian sport
1939 in track cycling